The 2017 World Draughts Championship at the international draughts held in Tallinn, Estonia. 79 players, who qualified through the championships of Europe, Asia, Africa, North and South America competed in the tournament, which ran from October 1, 2017, to October 16, 2017. Among them was women's grandmaster Matrena Nogovitsyna from Russia. Three round played in hotel Europe, other in Paul Keres Chess House. The winning prize for the tournament is 30,000 euros. The tournament will be supervised by main referee Andriy Shcherbatyuk (Ukraine). At the same time the 2017 Women's World Draughts Championship was held.

Rules and regulations
In the first stage 79 participants played in three groups Swiss-system tournament with 9 rounds. To define the places with equal points used of Solkoff truncated coefficient. The first four from each group participated in the final, total twelve players.

The final is in the form of a round-robin tournament, with 11 rounds in total. The games played in the official FMJD time rate with 1 hour and 20 minutes for the game plus 1 minute per move.

The final classification is based on the total points obtained. If two or more players will have same total points to define the places:

1. the largest number of victories

2. the best results between this players

3. the best results obtained in order of the classification.

Schedule

Results

Semifinal

GMI — international grandmaster

MI — international master

MF — master FMJD

GMIF — women's international grandmaster

Group A

Group B

Group C

Final

Results by round

1 round
 Guntis Valneris – Alexander Schwarzman 1–1
 Alexei Chizhov – Artem Ivanov 1–1
 Alexander Georgiev – Vadim Virny 1–1
 Yuri Anikeev – Alexander Baljakin 1–1
 Evgeni Vatutin – Joel Atse 1–1
 Martijn van IJzendoorn – Wouter Wolff 0–2

2 round
 Alexander Schwarzman – Wouter Wolff 2–0
 Joel Atse – Martijn van IJzendoorn 2–0
 Alexander Baljakin – Evgeni Vatutin 1–1
 Vadim Virny – Yuri Anikeev 1–1
 Artem Ivanov – Alexander Georgiev 1–1
 Guntis Valneris – Alexei Chizhov 1–1

3 round
 Alexei Chizhov – Alexander Schwarzman 1–1
 Alexander Georgiev – Guntis Valneris 1–1
 Yuri Anikeev – Artem Ivanov 1–1
 Evgeni Vatutin – Vadim Virny 1–1
 Martijn van IJzendoorn – Alexander Baljakin 1–1
 Wouter Wolff – Joel Atse 1–1

4 round
 Alexander Schwarzman – Joel Atse 1–1
 Alexander Baljakin – Wouter Wolff 1–1
 Vadim Virny – Martijn van IJzendoorn 0–2
 Artem Ivanov – Evgeni Vatutin 1–1
 Alexei Chizhov – Alexander Georgiev 2–0
 Guntis Valneris – Yuri Anikeev 1–1

5 round
 Alexander Georgiev – Alexander Schwarzman 1–1
 Yuri Anikeev – Alexei Chizhov 1–1
 Evgeni Vatutin – Guntis Valneris 0–2
 Martijn van IJzendoorn – Artem Ivanov 1–1
 Wouter Wolff – Vadim Virny 1–1
 Joel Atse – Alexander Baljakin 0–2

6 round
 Alexander Georgiev – Yuri Anikeev 1–1
 Alexei Chizhov – Evgeni Vatutin 1–1
 Guntis Valneris – Martijn van IJzendoorn 1–1
 Artem Ivanov – Wouter Wolff 0–2
 Vadim Virny – Joel Atse 1–1
 Alexander Schwarzman – Alexander Baljakin 1–1

7 round
 Yuri Anikeev – Alexander Schwarzman 1–1
 Evgeni Vatutin – Alexander Georgiev 1–1
 Martijn van IJzendoorn – Alexei Chizhov 1–1
 Wouter Wolff – Guntis Valneris 0–2
 Joel Atse – Artem Ivanov 1–1
 Alexander Baljakin – Vadim Virny 1–1

8 round
 Alexander Schwarzman – Vadim Virny 1–1
 Artem Ivanov – Alexander Baljakin 1–1
 Guntis Valneris – Joel Atse 1–1
 Alexei Chizhov – Wouter Wolff 1–1
 Alexander Georgiev – Martijn van IJzendoorn 1–1
 Yuri Anikeev – Evgeni Vatutin 2–0

9 round
 Alexander Schwarzman – Vadim Virny 1–1
 Artem Ivanov – Alexander Baljakin 1–1
 Guntis Valneris – Joel Atse 1–1
 Alexei Chizhov – Wouter Wolff 1–1
 Alexander Georgiev – Martijn van IJzendoorn 1–1
 Yuri Anikeev – Evgeni Vatutin 2–0

10 round
 Alexander Schwarzman – Artem Ivanov 2–0
 Guntis Valneris – Vadim Virny 1–1
 Alexei Chizhov – Alexander Baljakin 1–1
 Alexander Georgiev – Joel Atse 1–1
 Yuri Anikeev – Wouter Wolff 1–1
 Evgeni Vatutin – Martijn van IJzendoorn 1–1

11 round
 Martijn van IJzendoorn – Alexander Schwarzman 0–2
 Wouter Wolff – Evgeni Vatutin 1–1
 Joel Atse – Yuri Anikeev 1–1
 Alexander Baljakin – Alexander Georgiev 1–1
 Vadim Virny – Alexei Chizhov 0–2
 Artem Ivanov – Guntis Valneris 1–1

See also 
List of Draughts World Championship winners

References

External links
 List of players
 Offiсial site
 Results of final
 Results of final on site KNDB
 Results semifinal A 
 Results semifinal B
 Results semifinal C
 Results semifinal A on site KNDB
 Results semifinal B on site KNDB
 Results semifinal C on site KNDB

2017 in draughts
Draughts world championships
Sports competitions in Tallinn
2017 in Estonian sport
International sports competitions hosted by Estonia
October 2017 sports events in Europe